Hizon is a Filipino surname. Notable people with the surname include:

Rico Hizon (born 1966), Filipino journalist
Vince Hizon (born 1970), American-born Filipino basketball player
Jheric Hizon (born 1972), Filipino Canadian Hiphop artist and DJ

See also
Patricia Bermudez-Hizon (born 1977), Filipino television host

Tagalog-language surnames